Castle Eaton is a village and civil parish in the ceremonial county of Wiltshire, England, on the River Thames about  northwest of Highworth. It was historically in the area governed by the (former) Wiltshire County Council, but since 1997 has been part of the Swindon unitary authority. The Thames at Castle Eaton forms both the northern boundary of the parish and the county boundary with Gloucestershire.

The village is characterised by its older buildings most of which are in The Street, the original main thoroughfare. Built of local stone, these buildings give Castle Eaton the look and feel of a traditional Cotswold village. Many of the buildings date from about 1650 to 1850, and Swindon Council has made this part of the village a Conservation Area to protect its historical and architectural importance.

Parish church

The parish church dedicated to Saint Mary the Virgin is a Grade I listed building. It has two Norman doorways. The chancel was built late in the 13th century in the Early English Gothic style, and at its east end has a trio of stepped lancet windows. The building was restored by William Butterfield in 1861–63, who added a distinctive corbelled bellcote on the roof above the chancel arch. The west tower has a ring of six bells.

In the churchyard near the entrance is a medieval standing cross that is a scheduled Ancient Monument.

The church can be reached only on foot, via a path linking the lychgate with the east end of The Street.

Amenities
The village has a public house, the Red Lion. It claims to be first public house on the River Thames after leaving its source at Thames Head in the Cotswolds.

Thames Path
Castle Eaton is on the Thames Path National Trail between the towns of Cricklade, upstream to the west, and Lechlade, downstream to the east. The Cricklade to Lechlade section of the Thames Path is 11.6 miles long of which 5.3 miles is alongside the river, with detours where riverside access has not been possible. In Castle Eaton, the path is unable to follow the banks of the river and instead makes its way through the centre of the village. On leaving the village to the east, the path continues through farmland before rejoining the river close to the village of Kempsford, which can be seen along with its distinctive church on the opposite bank.

Sections
Opened in 1996, the Thames Path is managed by National Trails who have separated it into individually numbered sections for management purposes. The 184-mile path starts numerically in London with Section 1 and finishes at the river's source in Gloucestershire with Section 64. Castle Eaton marks the boundary of two sections:

Flooding
Large areas of land through which sections 61 and 62 of the Thames Path pass are prone to flooding. This is more likely in winter but can occur in other seasons after heavy rain.  Flooding can make parts of these sections impassable.  One of the pictures above shows Section 62 of the path totally submerged just west of Castle Eaton.

See also
Castle Eaton Bridge

References

Sources

External links

Villages in Wiltshire
Civil parishes in Wiltshire
Borough of Swindon